Eliseo Brown (29 October 1888 – unknown)  was an Argentine international footballer who played as a forward.

Early life
Brown was an Argentine of Scottish origin.

Brown had four brothers who were also Argentine international players – Alfredo, Carlos, Ernesto and Jorge – as well as one cousin, Juan Domingo. Two other brothers – Diego and Tomás – were also footballers.

Career
Brown played club football for Alumni, and international football for the Argentina national team. Brown was top-scorer in the Primera División in the 1906, 1907, 1908 and 1909 seasons.

Brown played for the Argentina national team between 1906 and 1911, scoring 6 goals in 10 official appearances.

References

1888 births
Year of death missing
Argentine footballers
Argentina international footballers
Argentine people of Scottish descent
Argentine Primera División players
Alumni Athletic Club players
Association football forwards
Brown family (Argentina)